Amaechi is both a surname and a given name. Notable people with the name include:

John Amaechi (b. 1970), broadcaster and retired NBA basketball player
Judith Amaechi (b. 1970), wife of Rotimi Amaechi
Mbazulike Amaechi (1929–2022), Nigerian politician and Minister for Aviation
Obiageri Amaechi (b. 1999), Nigerian discus thrower
Rotimi Amaechi (b. 1964), Nigerian politician and Minister for Transportation
Amaechi Igwe (b. 1988), American soccer player
Amaechi Uzoigwe, co-founder of the Definitive Jux record label

Igbo names